Tim Charles Pieter Receveur (born 30 July 1991) is a Dutch professional footballer who plays as a midfielder for Dordrecht on loan from Almere City. He formerly played for AGOVV Apeldoorn, VVV-Venlo and De Graafschap.

Football career
Born in Amersfoort, Receveur started playing for AFC before moving to the youth academy of Ajax in 2000, where he subsequently played for 10 years. Afterwards he joined NAC Breda in 2010, where he was appointed team captain of the reserve team, Jong NAC, for the 2010–11 season. 

Receveur then moved to AGOVV, where he signed a two-year contract. On 8 August 2011, he made his league debut in the home game against SC Cambuur (2–4). After AGOVV went bankrupt in January 2013, he moved to Almere City FC a month later. At the end of April 2013, he signed a two-year contract there, which he extended for another year afterwards. On 15 May 2015, the midfielder sustained a serious knee injury during the second leg of the promotion play-off game against De Graafschap. Through ten months of injuries, he did not return to play until the end of the 2015–16 season. After the season ended, Receveur, who had become a free agent, moved to VVV-Venlo where he signed a one-year contract with an option for another season. There, he lost the competition in midfield to Danny Post and Clint Leemans and as a result only made 17 league appearances that year, 16 of them as a substitute, as VVV won the Eerste Divisie league title. After one season in Venlo, Receveur moved to De Graafschap where he also signed a one-year contract. With De Graafschap, he won another promotion to the Eredivisie, this time through playoffs. Receveur returned to Almere City in June 2018.

On 27 January 2023, Receveur moved to Dordrecht on loan until the end of the 2022–23 season, and also signed a two-year contract with Dordrect that will begin in July 2023 after his contract with Almere City expires.

Honours

Club
VVV-Venlo
Eerste Divisie: 2016–17

De Graafschap
Eerste Divisie playoffs: 2018

References

External links
 
 Voetbal International profile 

1991 births
Living people
Sportspeople from Amersfoort
Footballers from Utrecht (province)
Dutch people of Belgian descent
Association football midfielders
Dutch footballers
Amsterdamsche FC players
AFC Ajax players
NAC Breda players
AGOVV Apeldoorn players
Almere City FC players
VVV-Venlo players
De Graafschap players
FC Dordrecht players
Eerste Divisie players